São Gonçalo do Sapucaí is a municipality in the state of Minas Gerais in the Southeast region of Brazil.

The estimated population is approximately 25,561 inhabitants and the area of the municipality is 517,974 km². The elevation is 906 m.

Notable people
Cristiano Luís Rodrigues - footballer

See also
List of municipalities in Minas Gerais

References

Municipalities in Minas Gerais